Hideomi is a masculine Japanese given name. Notable people with the name include:

, Japanese volleyball player
, Japanese footballer

Japanese masculine given names